Henry Wickham Wickham (1800 – 23 September 1867) was British Conservative party politician.

He was Member of Parliament (MP) for Bradford in West Yorkshire  from 1852 until his death in 1867.

References 

Conservative Party (UK) MPs for English constituencies
UK MPs 1852–1857
UK MPs 1857–1859
UK MPs 1859–1865
UK MPs 1865–1868
1800 births
1867 deaths
Politicians from Bradford